A walkie-talkie is a two-way handheld radio.

Walkie-talkie may also refer to:

Walkie-Talkie (Apple), a push-to-speak messaging service for Apple Watch
Walkie Talkie (band), a Taiwanese band
20 Fenchurch Street, a skyscraper in London also known as the Walkie-Talkie
A term for chicken feet in South African cuisine

See also
Talkie Walkie, a 2004 album by Air